The Antakya Synagogue is located in Antakya, Turkey near the border with Syria. It serves the few remaining members of the once thriving, 2,300-year-old Jewish community of ancient Antioch (now largely composed of descendants of Syrian Jews) that, by 2014, had shrunk to fewer than 20 members.

The building was erected in 1890.  Because Antakya is north of Jerusalem, the synagogue is built with the Torah Ark on the southern wall in a semi-circular apse. (Joel A. Zack, Historic synagogues of Turkey, 2008, p. 188)

The synagogue was badly damaged in the 2023 Turkey–Syria earthquake.

See also 
List of synagogues in Turkey
History of Jews in Turkey

References

External links 
 Description of Antakya Synagogue

Synagogues in Turkey
Antakya
Buildings and structures in Hatay Province
Syrian diaspora in Asia

Buildings damaged by the 2023 Turkey–Syria earthquake